The Breath of Suspension is a collection of science fiction stories by American writer Alexander Jablokov.  It was released in 1994 . It was the author's first book published by Arkham House. It was published in an edition of 3,496 copies. The stories originally appeared in Isaac Asimov's Science Fiction Magazine.

Contents
 "The Breath of Suspension"
 "Living Will"
 "Many Mansions"
 "The Death Artist"
 "At the Cross-Time Jaunters' Ball"
 "Above Ancient Seas"
 "Deathbinder"
 "The Ring of Memory"
 "Beneath the Shadow of Her Smile"
 "A Deeper Sea"

Sources

External links 
 

1994 short story collections
Science fiction short story collections
Works originally published in Asimov's Science Fiction